The 2017–18 DePaul Blue Demons women's basketball team represents DePaul University during the 2017–18 NCAA Division I women's basketball season. The Blue Demons, led by thirty-second year head coach Doug Bruno, play their home games at the Wintrust Arena. They were members of the Big East Conference. They finished the season 27–8, 15–3 in Big East play to share the Big East regular season title with Marquette. They won the Big East women's tournament by defeating Marquette in the championship game. They received an automatic bid to the NCAA women's tournament where they defeated Oklahoma in the first round before losing to Texas A&M in the second round.

This was the Blue Demons' first season at the new Wintrust Arena at the McCormick Place convention center. The arena is also the new home to the DePaul men's team.

Previous season

Roster

Schedule

|-
!colspan=9 style="background:#; color:white;"| Exhibition

|-
!colspan=9 style="background:#; color:white;"| Non-conference regular season

|-
!colspan=9 style="background:#; color:white;"| Conference regular season

|-
!colspan=9 style="background:#; color:white;"| Big East Women's Tournament

|-
!colspan=9 style="background:#; color:white;"| NCAA Women's Tournament

Source:

Rankings
2017–18 NCAA Division I women's basketball rankings

References

DePaul
DePaul Blue Demons women's basketball seasons
Depaul
Depaul
DePaul